Paul E Whetnall (19 February 1947 – 1 May 2014) was an English badminton player who won national and international titles between 1968 and 1980. He was married to Susan Pound Whetnall who was an outstanding player of the same era.

Career
Whetnall was noted for his shot-making accuracy and tactical astuteness. In his most successful season, 1975–1976, Whetnall won the open men's singles crowns of South Africa, Scotland, Germany, and the USA, as well as his third and last English National singles title. In 1970 Whetnall was a men's singles runner-up in the quadrennial British Commonwealth Games, losing a close final to Canada's Jamie Paulson. Shortly after this, his tournament career suffered a -year hiatus due to a badminton pro-tour venture which folded in 1973. Whetnall represented England in Thomas Cup (men's international team) competition in the 1969–1970 and 1975–1976 campaigns.

He represented England and won a silver medal in the singles, at the 1970 British Commonwealth Games in Edinburgh, Scotland. Four years later he won a second silver medal (in the mixed doubles) at the 1974 British Commonwealth Games, Christchurch, New Zealand.

He coached badminton in Kent for many years

Personal life
He married fellow international Sue Pound in 1968.

References 

English male badminton players
Badminton players at the 1970 British Commonwealth Games
Badminton players at the 1974 British Commonwealth Games
Commonwealth Games silver medallists for England
1947 births
2014 deaths
Commonwealth Games medallists in badminton
Medallists at the 1970 British Commonwealth Games
Medallists at the 1974 British Commonwealth Games